The Institute of Arctic Biology or IAB of the University of Alaska Fairbanks, is located in Fairbanks, Alaska, USA. The institute was established in 1963 by the Board of Regents of the University of Alaska, with Laurence Irving serving as its founding director. The  mission of IAB is to advance basic and applied knowledge of high-latitude biological systems through research, education, and service. The Institute supports faculty, post-doctoral, and graduate research in wildlife biology and management, ecology, evolutionary biology, physiology, genetics, biomedicine, bioinformatics, and computational biology. IAB faculty hold joint appointments within other departments at UAF in the College of Natural Science and Mathematics and the School of Natural Resources and Agricultural Sciences.

Important facilities and research programs that the Institute of Arctic Biology supports are:

 The Toolik Field Station; part of the LTER network, is a world-renowned Arctic climate change research station located in the northern foothills of the Brooks Range, Alaska, USA. 
 The Center for Alaska Native Health Research
 The Alaska Basic Neuroscience Program
 Center for Molecular and Genetic Studies of Hibernation 
 The Alaska Geobotany Center
 The Resilience and Adaptation Program 
 The Bonanza Creek Long-Term Ecological Research Site
 The Alaska Cooperative Fish and Wildlife Research Unit; administered by IAB, began in 1950 and is part of a nationwide cooperative program to promote research and graduate student training in the ecology and management of fish, wildlife, and their habitats.

See also
 LTER
 NEON

References

External links
 

1963 establishments in Alaska
Arctic research
Biological research institutes in the United States
Research institutes in Alaska
University of Alaska Fairbanks